Internet company may refer to:
Internet service provider, a company whose main activity is providing Internet access to customers
Dot-com company, a company which does most of its business on the Internet.